Ajdin Redžić (born 25 January 1997) is a Bosnian professional footballer who plays as a midfielder for Bosnian Premier League club Krupa.

Honours
Krupa
First League of RS: 2019–20
Bosnian Cup runner-up: 2017–18

References

External links
Ajdin Redžić at Sofascore

1997 births
Living people
People from Bihać
Bosnia and Herzegovina footballers
Premier League of Bosnia and Herzegovina players
First League of the Republika Srpska players
FK Rudar Prijedor players
FK Borac Banja Luka players
FK Krupa players
Bosnia and Herzegovina youth international footballers
Bosnia and Herzegovina under-21 international footballers
Association football midfielders